Zodarion aurorae is a species of ant-eating spiders native to Romania.

See also
 List of Zodariidae species

References

aurorae
Spiders of Europe
Spiders described in 1982